Joseph Anthony Sofia, Jr. (born October 8, 1991) is an American soccer player.

Career

College and Amateur
Sofia spent his entire college career at UCLA.  He made a total of 82 appearances with the Bruins and tallied 5 goals and 8 assists.

During his time in college, Sofia also played in the USL Premier Development League for Orange County Blue Star and Ventura County Fusion.

Professional
On January 16, 2014, Sofia was drafted in the second round of the 2014 MLS SuperDraft (28th overall) by San Jose Earthquakes.  He signed with the club two months later.

On May 18, 2014, Sofia joined USL Pro club Orange County Blues FC on loan and made his professional debut in a 1-0 defeat to the Sounders FC Reserves in a USL Pro-MLS Reserve interleague match.

Sofia was waived by San Jose on July 2, 2014.

References

External links

UCLA Bruins bio

1991 births
Living people
American soccer players
Association football defenders
Orange County Blue Star players
Orange County SC players
People from Rancho Santa Margarita, California
San Jose Earthquakes draft picks
San Jose Earthquakes players
Soccer players from California
Sportspeople from Orange County, California
UCLA Bruins men's soccer players
USL Championship players
USL League Two players
Ventura County Fusion players